Fuzzy differential inclusion  is tha culmination of Fuzzy concept and Differential inclusion   introduced by Lotfi A. Zadeh which became popular.

  ,

f(t,x(t)] is a fuzzy valued continuous function on euclidian space which is collection of all normal, upper semi-continuous, Convex set

Second order differential 
The second order differential is

   where 

K is trapezoidal fuzzy number (-1,-1/2,0,1/2)

 is a trianglular fuzzy number (-1,0,1)  .

Applications 
Fuzzy differential inclusion (FDI) has applications in
 Cybernetics
 Artificial intelligence , Neural network,
 Medical imaging
 Robotics
 Atmospheric dispersion modeling
 Weather forecasting
 Cyclone
 Population biology
 Stochastic process , Probability theory

References 

Mathematics
Fuzzy logic